Ꞡ (lowercase ꞡ) is a letter derived from the Latin alphabet letter G, combined with a bar diacritic. It was used in Latvian orthography before 1921.

The forms are represented in Unicode as:

References

Latin-script letters
Latvian language